Flaminio Silva is a former football striker from Paraguay who played for Olimpia Asunción in the 1930s.

Silva was the top goalscorer in a single season in Paraguayan football, after scoring 34 goals in 1936.

Titles

See also
 Players and Records in Paraguayan Football

References

External links
Profile

Paraguayan footballers
Club Olimpia footballers
Year of birth missing
Year of death missing
Association football forwards